'PCTI Solutions' is a provider of electronic document management and transfer solutions designed specifically for healthcare organisations in the UK.

Docman
Docman is used by over 6,000 GP practices Docman to manage documents electronically. The software is used by every GP practice in NHS Scotland and is cited in the Good Practice Guidelines for General Practice Good Practice Guidelines.

EDT Hub
EDT Hub is used by over 40 NHS Trusts to send documents electronically from NHS Secondary Care Trusts to NHS Primary Care Trusts. More recently the solution has been chosen by NHS Scotland for a national roll-out as reported in The Guardian.

EDT Hub has ability to link multiple secondary care organisations with multiple primary care organisations, and saves the NHS money because it reduces paper consumption and printing costs whilst speeding up delivery and reducing the risk of document loss. 
 
Documents typically handled by EDT Hub include:

Discharge Summaries
Discharge Letters
Encounter Reports
Radiology Reports
Outpatient Clinic Letters
Out-of-Hours Reports

This product is notable as one of the first of its kind to be granted NHS Interoperability Toolkit Accreditation.

References 

6,000 Gp practices
Good Practice Guidelines
EDT Hub for Ashford and St Peters NHS Foundation Trust.

Document management systems
Private providers of NHS services